Robert Munro is a Canadian retired ice hockey centre and coach who was a two-time All-American for North Dakota.

Career
After winning the 1964 junior league championship, Munro began attending North Dakota in the fall of 1965 and joined the varsity team the following year. From the start he was one of the stars of the offense, leading the Fighting Sioux with 30 points as a sophomore. He helped UND finish atop the WCHA that season and pushed the team into the NCAA Tournament. The Sioux, however, played very poorly in the championship, finishing 4th while scoring just one goal in two games. The following year Munro led the team in scoring once more, this time acting as more of a distributor than a scorer. While UND was third in the conference they were still able to earn a share of the conference championship and return to the tournament. For his leadership, Munro was named to both the All-WCHA and All-American teams. Munro helped UND earn one of the biggest upsets in tournament history, scoring the third goal in their 3–1 in over Ken Dryden's powerhouse Cornell squad. UND run was ended by a 0–04 loss to Denver in the championship game.

As a senior, Munro was named team captain and led the Sioux in scoring for the third consecutive year. While his overall totals were low, Munro is one of four players to lead UND in scoring three years running (as of 2020), Ben Cherski, Bill Reichart and Greg Johnson being the others. UND finished 3rd in the conference again, however, they were upset in the first round of the conference tournament and Munro's tenure with the Sioux was ended abruptly.

The next season, Munro benefited from the rapid expansion of the NHL and embarked on a professional career. He played most of two seasons with the Muskegon Mohawks, scoring more than a point per game in both campaigns. In 1971 he got a brief call up to the Montreal Voyageurs of the AHL but Munro went scoreless in 4 contests. Rather than continue with minor professional hockey, Munro returned to college. He attended the University of Toronto and played on the hockey team while furthering his studies. In two seasons with the Varsity Blues, Munro's team's lost just one game and he ended his college career on Toronto's undefeated 1973 championship team. After leaving Toronto, Munro played three seasons of senior hockey before hanging up his skates. He was inducted into the North Dakota Athletic Hall of Fame in 1986.

Statistics

Regular season and playoffs

Awards and honors

References

External links

1946 births
Living people
Canadian ice hockey centres
Ice hockey people from Ontario
Sportspeople from Thunder Bay
North Dakota Fighting Hawks men's ice hockey players
Muskegon Mohawks players
Montreal Voyageurs players
Toronto Varsity Blues players
AHCA Division I men's ice hockey All-Americans